Gu Fangzhou (June 1926 – 2 January 2019) was a Chinese virologist, best known for developing domestic OPV (oral polio vaccine) and eradicating polio in the country.

Early life 
Gu matriculated at Peking University for a MBBS degree in 1944. He went to the Soviet Union to study virology from 1951 to 1955. He was engaged in poliovirus from 1957.

Gu conducted the trials and production of the polio vaccine, especially "sugar cube". He succeeded in developing first domestic inactivated polio vaccine in 1960, and trivalent oral polio vaccine later. He served as president of Peking Union Medical College from 1984 to 1993. He was also the first president of the Chinese Society for Immunology.

On 2 January 2019, Gu died in Beijing, at the age of 92.

References 

1926 births
2019 deaths
Chinese virologists
Peking University alumni
Academic staff of Peking Union Medical College
TWAS fellows
Polio
Biologists from Shanghai
Educators from Shanghai
People of the Republic of China